Medgidia ( or ; historical Turkish names: Karasu or Carasu, Mecidiye or Megidie) is a city in Constanța County, Northern Dobruja, south-eastern Romania.

History

Archaeological findings show that Dobruja was inhabited since the Neolithic period. Starting with 46 BC the region was administered by the Roman Empire. A castrum was built in the Carasu Valley, becoming the cradle of the settlement.

In 1417, the Turks invaded Dobruja. From the 15th century onwards, the region started to be colonized with a Muslim population. The settlement named "Karasu" (Turkish for "Black Water") was mentioned on the map of Iehuda ben Zara in 1497, in the notes of Paolo Giorgio (1590) and Evliya Çelebi (1653).

Modern Medgidia was built by the Ottoman administration on the place of the old Karasu beginning with 1856. It was built as a planned city to accommodate refugees from the Crimean War and to serve as an economic hub for the central zone of Dobruja. The town was named in honour of the sultan Abdülmecid I, the Ottoman sovereign of the period.

After the Russo-Turkish War (1877–1878), Northern Dobruja became part of Romania. Medgidia was the last capital of Silistra Nouă County (1878–1879) before it was merged into Constanța County.

Geography
Medgidia is located between the Danube and the Black Sea, 39 kilometres away from Constanța.

The general aspect of the relief is that of a low plateau with a limestone structure, covered with thick deposits of loess.
The natural resources in the area consist of limestone deposits and kaolin sand. The limestone structure of the earth permits a natural filtering of the groundwater.

Climate
The climate is temperate-continental, with short and cold winters and very hot summers.

Local administration
Medgidia became a municipality in 1994.

The town infrastructure is continuously developing and offers the inhabitants 4 high schools, 8 primary schools, 12 nurseries, 4 cultural centers with a hall for cultural activities, 2 show and cinema halls, 3 clubs and 5 libraries, a 30,000-seat stadium, a sports hall and a swimming pool. Medgidia also houses a 500-bed hospital.

The following villages are administered by the municipality:
 Remus Opreanu (historical name:  Alibei-Ceair) – renamed after Remus Opreanu, the first Romanian prefect of Constanța County (1878–1881)
 Valea Dacilor (historical name: Endecarachioi,  or Hendek Kara Kuyusu)

Politics 

The current mayor of Medgidia is Valentin Vrabie (PNL).

The Medgidia Municipal Council, elected in the 2020 local government elections, consists of 19 councilors, with the following party composition:

Economy
The economic landscape spotlights the existence of a town fully involved in its progress. Out of 1,200 registered enterprises, only 30 are state-owned and 15 are joint ventures.

Beside the agricultural activities (milk-processing, milling, bakery and wine growing), the main industry deals in cement and building materials, agricultural machinery and forging equipment, wood processing and furniture factories.

Medgidia lies in the center of an agricultural area of several tens of millions hectares, with a fertile soil and provided with irrigation systems.

The area offers:
 a rich agricultural tradition and trained specialists
 a road network for the transport of goods
 relatively short transport distances, especially through the port
 access to other Romanian or European regions
 better climate conditions than in other parts of Romania (winter is shorter)
 an outstanding irrigation potential

The Medgidia clinker storage facility was completed in 2009 and is the world's largest dome-type cement clinker storage facility.

Transport
The town is a road and rail node and an inland port to the Danube-Black Sea Canal. The Danube-Black Sea Canal crosses the town for about 6 km of its length.

Provided with road and rail links, the harbor offers storage facilities and cranes able to lift up to 16-ton weights. Beside a SNCFR marshaling yard, along the Canal there is a Free Trade Area in course of being finalized.

A planned highway from Bucharest to Constanţa, partially financed by the EU, will bypass the town, allowing the development of associated services (hotels, petrol stations and a parking yard for trucks) in the area.

Also, the Medgidia railway station links trains to a few, but very important towns and cities, including Constanţa (35 km), Tulcea (144 km), and București Nord (199 km).

Landmarks

The Art Museum "Lucian Grigorescu"
It was opened in 1964 with exhibitions of Romanian contemporary painting, sculpture, and graphics, signed Lucian Grigorescu, Marius Bunescu, Ion Jalea and others. The permanent exhibition takes in classic and modern artworks but also works of contemporary art classics: Lucian Grigorescu, Nicolae Tonitza, Francisc Șirato, Ștefan Dumitrescu, Iosif Iser. The museum also displays a collection of ceramic artworks.

In 1991 the museum was named after Lucian Grigorescu, a town native, who was deemed as the most Latin among the Romanian painters. 
The city honors the painter every year on 1 February, the anniversary of his birthday.

Because of low income due to few visitors and high maintenance costs in 2009 the museum was closed.

The "Abdul Mejid" Mosque
Built in 1860 by the Ottoman Government, the mosque is an historic and architectural monument. It was named after the sultan Abdul Mejid – who reigned between 1839 and 1861.

The mosque is served by an imam and a muezzin. The building respects the traditional form of the Muslim cultural placements, decorated in the interior with oriental ornaments and inscriptions in Arabic.

The "Saints Peter and Paul" Orthodox church
The church was built in a Roman-Greek style and it was raised with the contribution of the local Christians on the ruins of a Roman castrum.

The Serbian Heroes' Monument
In 1926, Medgidia commemorated the heroism of the First Serbian Division, which fought in Dobruja during World War I as a part of the bloody Romanian theatre, by inaugurating a monument in the group's honor. The completed memorial, featuring an iconic white marble pyramid, was the setting of a ceremony held with the participation of both Romanian and Yugoslavian officials. Wreaths were laid at the base of the monument by members of the Serbian and Romanian royal families.

The Medgidia Festival
The festival has been celebrated each year since 1999, at the end of October, and is attended by thousands of locals.

Media
Graiul Dobrogei (link Graiul Dobrogei), local newspaper
Alpha Media, local TV channel
Media TV, local TV channel

International relations

Twin towns — Sister cities
Medgidia is twinned with:
 Cahul, Moldova
 Favara, Italy
 Zhumadian, China
 Yalova, Turkey

References

External links

Populated places in Constanța County
Localities in Northern Dobruja
Cities in Romania
Turkish communities in Romania
Place names of Turkish origin in Romania
1856 establishments in the Ottoman Empire